The Central Fidelity Banks International is a defunct WTA Tour affiliated tennis tournament played from 1979 to 1984. It was held in Richmond, Virginia in the United States and played on indoor carpet courts from 1979 to 1983 and on outdoor hard courts in 1984.

The 1984 tournament is famous for the first-round match between Vicki Nelson-Dunbar and Jean Hepner which lasted six hours and 31 minutes, the longest women's match ever played. The match featured the longest rally in professional tennis history, a 643-shot rally that lasted 29 minutes.

Past finals

Singles

Doubles

References

 WTA Results Archive

 
Hard court tennis tournaments in the United States
Carpet court tennis tournaments
Indoor tennis tournaments
Tennis in Virginia
Sports in Richmond, Virginia
Recurring sporting events established in 1979
Recurring events disestablished in 1984
Defunct tennis tournaments in the United States

fr:Tournoi de Richmond
it:Virginia Slims of Richmond